Dysfunktional Family is the soundtrack to George Gallo-directed 2003 documentary stand-up comedy film Dysfunktional Family. It was released on March 11, 2003 through the newly reformed Death Row Records, which at the time was known as Tha Row Records. Production was handled by the label's production team, Tha Row Hitters, as well as China Black, Flash Technology, Irv Gotti, Just Blaze, Juvenile, Sir Jinx and Skip "17 Freeze" Wayne. It features contributions from Crooked I, Eastwood, Danny Boy, Ganxsta Ridd, Kurupt, Spider Loc, Ashanti, Gail Gotti, Ja Rule, Jay-Z, Juvenile, Michel'le, N.I.N.A., Virginya Slim, Phobia, Skip "17 Freeze" Wayne, Young Buck, and film star Eddie Griffin. The album was a minor success, peaking at #95 on the Billboard 200, #14 on the Top R&B/Hip-Hop Albums, #6 on the Top Soundtracks and #4 on the Independent Albums.

Track listing

Charts

References

External links

Hip hop soundtracks
2003 soundtrack albums
Comedy film soundtracks
Gangsta rap soundtracks
Documentary film soundtracks
Death Row Records soundtracks